St James's Church, Bermondsey, is a Church of England parish church in Bermondsey, south London. Designed by James Savage, it was most expensive of the churches built by the Commission for Building Fifty New Churches. It was completed and consecrated in 1829 and given a separate parish (split off from the ancient parish of St Mary Magdalene's, Bermondsey) in 1840. In 1949 it was designated a Grade II* listed building.

The churchyard was closed to burials in 1855, and was then used for communal drying. It was converted to gardens by the Metropolitan Public Gardens Association, and opened to the public in 1886. An obelisk memorial and some chest-tombs were retained.

See also
 Grade I and II* listed buildings in the London Borough of Southwark

References

Sources

Bermondsey
Bermondsey
19th-century Church of England church buildings
Bermondsey
Bermondsey